Viggers is a surname. Notable people with the surname include:

Freddie Viggers (born 1951), former senior British Army officer and current Gentleman Usher of the Black Rod
Peter Viggers (1938–2020), British politician and lawyer

See also
Vickers (surname)